Wesley Chapel High School (WCHS) is a public high school in Wesley Chapel, Florida, United States. It is part of the Pasco County Schools district. The school opened on August 16, 1999.

, it is ranked 186th in Florida and 3,757th nationally. The graduation rate lists at 91%. Students have the opportunity to take Advanced Placement coursework and exams. The AP participation rate at the school is 47%. The total minority enrollment is 47%, and 46% of students are economically disadvantaged.

Notable alumni 
 Erik Thomas, basketball player
 Greg Jenkins, football player
 Tre' McKitty, football player

References

External links 
 

High schools in Pasco County, Florida
Public high schools in Florida